The Lola T95/00 is an open-wheel racing car chassis, designed and built by Lola Cars that competed in the CART open-wheel racing series, for competition in the 1995 IndyCar season. It was slightly more competitive than its predecessors, managing to score four wins that season. It was mainly powered by the  Ford/Cosworth XB turbo engine, but also used the Mercedes-Benz IC108 engine, and the Buick Indy V6 engine.

References 

Open wheel racing cars
American Championship racing cars
Lola racing cars